Ramón Mellado Parsons (October 31, 1904 - June 7, 1985) was an educator, writer, politician and a former Puerto Rico Secretary of Education.

Early days
Had a bachelor's degree in Science from the University of Puerto Rico in 1927. In 1940 earned a Master of Arts from Columbia University in New York and His Doctorate in Education in 1947.

Education career
He worked as a science teacher at Julio L. Vizcarrondo Coronado High School in Carolina, Puerto Rico. He was subsequently appointed Superintendent of Schools (1932–34), General Supervisor of Sciences), Deputy Commissioner of Public Instruction and appointed Secretary of Education of Puerto Rico (1969-1971).

As a university educator he began in 1943, serving as Professor and Director of the Department of Pedagogy of the University of Puerto Rico, Río Piedras Campus until 1948. At this study center he held the positions of Dean of Administration (1948–56) and Professor of the Graduate School of Pedagogy (1957–68).

In 1948, he published "Culture and education in Puerto Rico".

Politics
He was delegated to the Constitutional Convention of Puerto Rico in 1952. In 1972 he was elected Senator At-large by the New Progressive Party.

Legacy
An elementary school in Carolina, Puerto Rico was named after him.

References

1904 births
1985 deaths
Teachers College, Columbia University alumni
Members of the Senate of Puerto Rico
People from Carolina, Puerto Rico
Puerto Rican educators
Puerto Rican writers
Secretaries of Education of Puerto Rico
University of Puerto Rico alumni
University of Puerto Rico faculty
20th-century American politicians